Amazing Grace 3: A Country Salute to Gospel is a Christian country album with various artists. It was released on June 15, 2004 via Sparrow Records.

Track listing

Chart performance

References

Country albums by American artists
2004 compilation albums